Demography > The Basement Tapes is a compilation album by 16volt, released on November 14, 2000, by Cleopatra Records. The album comprises a collection of old, unfinished tracks by the band. Specifically, it contains the Imitation cassette produced in 1991, which helped 16volt secure a place on Re-Constriction Records, and "Out of Time", which was cut from their first album, Wisdom, due to time constraints.

Reception
Fabryka awarded the album three out of four and said "Demography sounds a way hermetic with lots of electronics, less of raw guitars, more of bass sound."

Track listing

Personnel 
Adapted from the Demography > The Basement Tapes liner notes.

16volt
 Eric Powell – lead vocals, arrangements, production, engineering, design

Production and design
 Judson Leach – mastering

Release history

References

External links 
 
 

2000 compilation albums
16volt albums
Cleopatra Records compilation albums